Battleship Island can refer to:

Canada
Battleship Island, a privately owned island in British Columbia

Japan
Hashima Island, also called Battleship Island
Mitsukejima, also known as Battleship Island

United States
Battleship Island, in Alaska
Murdo Island, also called Battleship Island, in Alaska
Battleship Island, in Maine
Battleship Island, in Michigan
Battleship Island, in Minnesota
Mañagaha, also called Battleship Island, in the Northern Mariana Islands
Battleship Island, one of the San Juan Islands of Washington

Other uses
 Battleship Island (film), a South Korean film